The Mandarin's rings are a set of fictional weapons appearing in American comic books published by Marvel Comics. There are two versions of the rings in the Marvel Universe that differ in origin, design and functionality.

The Mandarin's rings were introduced in Tales of Suspense #50 ( February 1964) and created by Stan Lee and  Don Heck, as the signature weapons of the supervillain Mandarin. The rings are depicted as ten rings made from Makluan technology with each ring possessing a specific power.  Later stories reveal that each ring houses the spirit of a dead alien warrior and are given upgrades to gain sentience.

In the Marvel Cinematic Universe, the Ten Rings are a set of ten mystical iron rings used by Xu Wenwu and his son Xu Shang-Chi, providing the namesake and emblem of Wenwu's Ten Rings organization.  The Ten Rings were later integrated into the mainstream Marvel universe in Shang-Chi vol 2. #11 (April 2022) by writer Gene Luen Yang and artist Marcus To, where they are legendary weapons originating from Ta-Lo that are acquired by Shang-Chi.

Publication history 
The Mandarin's rings first appeared in Tales of Suspense #50 (Feb. 1964), written by Stan Lee and illustrated by Don Heck, as ten unnamed mystical rings worn by the Mandarin.  The rings' alien origins were revealed in Tales of Suspense #62 (Nov. 1964)

Originally given individual names that were literal descriptions of their powers, the Rings were renamed during Kieron Gillen's run on Iron Man along with the revelation that the Rings were sentient.

Following the release of Shang-Chi and the Legend of the Ten Rings (2021), Shang-Chi writer Gene Luen Yang began incorporating several concepts introduced in the film into the Shang-Chi mythos, with the Ten Rings weapons being introduced in Shang-Chi vol 2. #11.  Unlike the Marvel Cinematic Universe, the Ten Rings are unrelated to the Mandarin and originated from Ta-Lo, as opposed to the unanswered origins from the film.  The Ten Rings will be a central focus in the ongoing series Shang-Chi and the Ten Rings.

Despite the death of the Mandarin and the introduction of the Ten Rings from the MCU into the comics, the Mandarin's rings returned in Iron Man vol 6. #20.

Mandarin's rings

History

Origin
The man who would become the Mandarin wanders through the Valley of Spirits in China until he encounters a crashed Makluan spaceship. On the ship, he uncovers 10 uniquely shaped cylinders.<ref>Invincible Iron Man Annual" #1</ref> Over the following years, the Mandarin studies Makluan science until he masters it, learning that each cylinder possesses a unique power and fashions them into rings. With 10 rings, the Mandarin then becomes a conqueror and subjugates the villages around the Valley, and through his advanced science, rapidly becomes a power that not even the Chinese army can successfully challenge. He then embarks on a long series of attempts to achieve world domination. His conquests would lead him into conflict with the superhero Iron Man, his eventual archnemesis.

Seeking a means to increase his rings' power, the Mandarin learns of the legendary Eye of Yin, a talisman of power created by an ancient group of Chinese sorcerers. His attempts to acquiring the Eye lead to conflict with the Royal Family of the Inhumans, resulting in Black Bolt stripping the Mandarin of the rings and hiding them. To recover the rings, the Mandarin journeys back to the Valley of Spirits and the ruins of the Makluan starship, acquiring a Makluan headband to recover his rings. A subsequent team-up with the terminally ill Unicorn against Iron Man results in the headband exchanging his consciousness with that of the Unicorn. The Mandarin is forced to flee, desperate to separate himself from the Unicorn's dying body.

The Mandarin's efforts to restoring his body brings him into conflict the Yellow Claw, another master criminal and warlord of Chinese origin, resulting in the Mandarin's apparent death.  However, before the Unicorn's body is destroyed, the Mandarin uses the headband's mind-transferring capacities to transfer his consciousness into his rings. When the rings are confiscated by the Yellow Claw's power-hungry servant Loc Do and activated by him, the Mandarin's consciousness enters his body, permanently driving out Loc Do's consciousness. Using his matter-rearranger ring, the Mandarin transforms Loc Do's body into a younger duplicate of his own original one.

Taking the name Zhang Tong, the Mandarin starts a new criminal empire in Hong Kong and acquires the services of the Hand, permitting a single Hand agent to use one of the rings and having it automatically teleport back to the Mandarin if an agent is incapacitated; the ninja are also sworn to commit suicide if captured.. The Mandarin's agents kidnap James Rhodes and several of Tony Stark's other employees, forcing Iron Man into single combat in exchange for their lives. Iron Man defeats the Mandarin once again, and helps Stark's employees escape the Hand. The Hand ninjas are left without their weapons when their master is knocked unconscious, causing his rings to teleport back to him automatically and leaving them unarmed and unable to stop Stark's employees from fleeing.

Sometime later, the Mandarin discovers that one of his rings is an elaborate counterfeit. One of his underlings had betrayed him, surrendering the ring to Chen Hsu, an ancient wizard who lived in San Francisco. Hsu, elfin in appearance but puissant in power, gives up the ring to the Mandarin, who collapses as soon as he put it on. Chen Hsu tends to him, removing the veil of confusion from his mind; soon, the Mandarin realizes that his memories had been fragmented because of the theft of the ring since the rings were still linked to his consciousness.

Next, Chen Hsu makes the Mandarin an offer that involves them traveling to the Valley of the Dragons. There, Chen Hsu uses a magic herb to awaken Fin Fang Foom, an ancient and powerful dragon. Under the control of Hsu, the dragon obeys the Mandarin, laying waste to an army sent by the Chinese government to stop him. Soon the Mandarin claims a third of China's territory, and the authorities sent out a call for help to Iron Man.

When Iron Man confronts the Mandarin and Fin Fang Foom, eight other dragons appear. It is revealed that many thousands of years ago, a number of aliens from the planet Kakaranathara, the fourth planet of the star Maklu, traveled to Earth to look for the conflict which was unknown in their culture and which they craved. The ship crashed, stranding them on Earth for thousands of years, after which the Mandarin found the ship and claimed their rings. Now, they demand them back, but he refuses them. Iron Man forcibly combines his power with the rings, and manages to destroy the Makluan dragons. The blast vaporizes the Mandarin's hands and renders him comatose.

For months, the Mandarin lies in a state between life and death, in the care of a peasant woman who does not know who he is. Over time, his hands grow back, though they do so as reptilian claws, and the rings call to him again to reclaim them.

Under Temugin
The Mandarin's son Temugin receives a package containing his father's severed hands, bearing all ten rings of power. Honor-bound to fulfill his father's wishes for him, Temugin challenges Iron Man in order to avenge his father's death, and he proves a deadly adversary even without the rings.

After Tony Stark reveals a conspiracy for mass murder in his own ranks, Temugin appears to have forgiven Iron Man for the death of his father and to have turned to more lofty pursuits, but events indicate that the evil power of the rings has corrupted his soul.

When Temugin is contacted by Spot for a criminal venture, he uses the rings to imprison the Spot in another dimension with nothing but money. In the following issue, the Puma severs one of Temugin's hands, but despite this, he retains at least half of the rings and later possibly all of them, as Nightshade, who used the rings on his lost hand, is not seen with them at the end of the story.  Nevertheless, Temugin reappears without the rings, and with a cybernetic arm, as a member of the Atlas Foundation.

Required by the Mandarin
The Mandarin is revived in a subsequent Iron Man story arc, in which he is revealed to have been in a prison in central China for some time and is missing his hands. His rings return to him and are re-assimilated into his body by being heated and burned into his spine. The Mandarin eventually resurfaces as Tem Borjigin (yet another name of Genghis Khan), now employing artificial hands.

During the Mandarin's attempts to unleash the Extremis virus on the public, Iron Man defeats the Mandarin while wearing the Silver Centurion armor by tearing five of the rings out of the Mandarin's spine, blasting him with those rings, his unibeam, and his repulsor rays at the same time and then freezing him as he is engulfed in a deadly concentrated Extremis virus, thwarting the Extremis outbreak.  The Mandarin survives the encounter.

In "The Future" storyline, the Mandarin kidnaps Stark and brings him to Mandarin City to develop ten Titanomechs, which Mandarin plans to use as host bodies for each of his ten rings, which he reveals are actually vessels for the souls of ten alien beings. In truth, the Mandarin serves these beings and is planning to "resurrect" them in this fashion.

Tony forms an alliance with others that the Mandarin has imprisoned, including Zeke Stane, Whirlwind, Blizzard, and the Living Laser. In a rebellion against the Mandarin, Stark manages to alert his staff at Stark Resilient to find him and manages to destroy the Titanomechs. In the ensuing battle, the Mandarin is apparently killed by Stane, much to the dismay of Iron Man.

Upgrades and Successors
In the Marvel NOW! relaunch the Mandarin's rings manage to escape from S.H.I.E.L.D.'s Weapon Vault Omega, with the Liar Ring staying behind to create the illusion that the rings were still there. Each of the rings search for new hosts with the purpose of "saving Earth from Tony Stark", using persuasive language and mind control to bend them towards their cause against Iron Man. Each one of them is codenamed, from Mandarin-One to Mandarin-Ten:

 The Remaker Ring is taken by a Chinese gang warlord calling himself Lord Remaker. He commanded numerous triads which protected the city from anyone who wanted to interfere. However, he was stripped from his power when Tony Stark decided to rebuild the city into a futuristic utopia. Upon obtaining the Remaker Ring, Lord Remaker became Mandarin-One.
 Colin Sixty was part of the clone output created by A.I.M. He was created specifically to be sold to Cortex Inc. As "C. Anderson Sixty", Colin Sixty was put under the charge of the regional direction of Cortex Inc.'s Lunar operations in Tranquility Gulch. When Tony Stark, the governor of Tranquility Gulch went on a quest to kick out major competitors in the exploitation of Phlogistone, he revealed Anderson Sixty's true nature to the press in order to discredit Cortex by having allied with A.I.M.. With his life ruined, Colin tried to kill Stark with a laser cutter; using his martial arts training, Stark disposed of Colin's weapon and maimed his hand in a tank of liquid nitrogen. He is found by Mandarin's Influence Ring and made Mandarin-Two.
 Alec Eiffel is a fascist who is chosen by Mandarin's Spin Ring to be its host Mandarin-Three in order to help it and the other rings have revenge on Tony Stark.
 It is revealed that after reclaiming his kingdom Svartalfheim, Malekith the Accursed is approached by the Spectral Ring seeking a host, becoming Mandarin-Four. Malekith bends its will to his rather than letting it control his mind. He begins a campaign to attack all other "Mandarins" and take their rings, desiring "the full set" before attacking Tony Stark. Though he is usually a foe of Thor and other magical beings, his opposition to Iron Man is rooted in the Dark Elves' traditional weakness towards iron.
  is the black sheep of his family where he was the only member of his family that did not go through Terrigenesis during the Inhumanity storyline. Victor is confronted by the Nightbringer Ring of the Mandarin which finds him acceptable to be its wearer. With its power and still under the influence of alcohol, Victor attacks the Inhuman Nativity Center where his father Robert is apparently killed. Iron Man appears to stop him and Victor flees after the Golden Avenger injures his shoulder with a laser. The ring teleports Victor to a safe place. While recovering, Victor suffers from Terrigenesis, much to his surprise. As soon as he resurfaces, Victor is found and confronted by Medusa. She shows to him his father's remains at the Center. She also explains to Victor that he did not suffer from Terrigenesis, not because he did not have blood ties with his family, but because the level of exposure to the Terrigen Mists to activate the Terrigenesis in certain individuals can vary. She exiles Victor from the Inhumans for his actions. Victor blames himself for what he did, but the ring manages to make him blame Tony Stark from not stopping him when he was rampaging drunk. The ring also suggests Victor's new nickname, the Exile. The Exile is also referred to as Mandarin-Five. He is later killed by Arno Stark.
 The Daimonic Ring approaches the Mole Man in order to help it and the other rings have revenge on Tony Stark, where he becomes Mandarin-Six.
 Abigail Burns is an English activist who believes the world needs to be saved from capitalism, corporate hegemony and the impotence of democracy for which among her activities she writes columns. One night, the Incandescence Ring approaches her and decides she possesses the suitable will to become Mandarin-Seven and her mission is to "save the world from Tony Stark." Besides being referred to as Mandarin-Seven, Abigail calls herself Red Peril.
 Marc Kumar is a freelancer P.R. and marketing expert who met Pepper Potts in Las Vegas, during Tony Stark's absence in space, while he was handling a drunk client at a party Pepper was attending. After dating for months, Marc proposed to Pepper in Scotland. From the stories Pepper told him about Stark, Marc came to the conclusion that he treated her badly, and grew resentful of Tony. He is approached by the Liar Ring in order to help get revenge on Tony Stark, where he becomes Mandarin-Eight.
 An unnamed Broadway director/composer/conductor was formerly in charge of a musical based on Iron Man's life called The Man in the Iron Mask which portrayed Tony Stark as a pervert. Under the orders of Stark himself, the director was replaced, which he took poorly. The Lightning Ring latches onto the egotistical musical-theatre artist, calling himself The Lighting Conductor and operated as Mandarin-Nine.
 The supervillain Endotherm is chosen by the Zero Ring to become Mandarin-Ten and help to get revenge on Tony Stark. His ring is later stolen by Abigail Burns using a Master Ring.

However, after the Dark Elf Malekith the Accursed beheads Mandarin-One and Mandarin-Nine, as well as cutting off the hands of Mandarin-Seven, the remaining six Mandarins join forces just in time to attack Malekith while Iron Man was also mounting an assault on the Dark Elves. With Malekith defeated, the Mandarins initially contemplate continuing to work together due to Kumar's influence, but after Tony and Arno are able to use the recovered Remaker, Spectral, Incandescence and Lightning Rings to form a Master Ring that could control the others, as well as convincing Burns to help them, most of the remaining Mandarins are defeated in a final assault; the only one to escape is the Mole Man, who concludes that the rings are more trouble than they are worth.

With all ten rings now in custody, Iron Man realizes the recovered Recorder 451's corpse from deep space was transmitting an alien frequency that had upgraded the rings to become sentient.  Iron Man hands nine of the rings to the Rigellians while Arno gifts the Incandescence Ring back to Burns.

The Mandarin mysteriously reappears with all of his ten rings in his Tem Borjigen alias when Baron Zemo selects him as the public face of the HYDRA-occupied Bagalia in his shared plot with Dario Agger and the Roxxon Energy Corporation to have the United Nations recognize Bagalia as an independent nation. As part of his revenge on HYDRA for manipulating him during the "Secret Empire" storyline, the Punisher finds the Mandarin making a speech at the United Nations and fires a special bullet. Despite using his rings to slow down the bullet while trying to deflect it, the Mandarin is struck in the head and killed with the bullet, which is witnessed by Baron Zemo and everyone watching his speech.

Return
The Mandarin's rings fall into the possession of Source Control, a black market network specializing in high-grade technology and weapons.  Former Stark Industries employee and current Source Control operative Vic Martinelli steals the rings and attempts to contact Tony Stark for help, but is murdered by fellow operative, the Titanium Man, who recovers the rings.Iron Man vol. 6 #22. Marvel Comics  After defeating the Titanium Man, Iron Man and War Machine track the rings at Source Control's headquarters in Macau, where they are confronted by Source Control's leader Spymaster and his henchmen Force and Cobalt Man, who possesses the Mandarin's rings.  Cobalt Man is revealed to be Ironheart in disguise, who then proceeds to use the rings to defeat Source Control.  Stark allows Williams to keep the Mandarin's rings to study them and utilize their powers for good.

 Powers and abilities 
The rings' operations cannot be explained by contemporary Earth science, but it is known that they served as near-limitless power sources for the warp-drive engines of the Makluan starship of Axonn-Karr. The Mandarin learned how to convert the rings to his personal uses and to make them respond to his mental commands. The fingers on which he wears each ring, and the known functions for which he uses each ring, are given below.

As of writer Kieron Gillen's tenure on Iron Man, new names have been revealed for some rings which the rings—apparently sentient—use to identify one another. Capable of speech and inter-communication via telepathy, the rings demonstrate personality traits and are even capable of mocking and humiliating the Nightbringer ring for failing to find a host at the same time as its fellows. The sentience was later revealed to be a temporary power-up caused by contact with the Recorder 451.

 Ten Rings (Ta-Lo) 

History
The Ten Rings are a set of ten mystical iron rings that are one of the Five Sets of Heavenly Weapons of Ta-Lo, along with the One Hammer, Two Swords, Three Staffs and Nine Daggers.  

When the Eldritch parasite called the Wyrm of Desolation attacked the realm of Ta-Lo during prehistory, the Xian deity Nezha sealed the Wyrm in a pocket dimension with his Universe Ring (乾坤圈).  Within its prison, the Wyrm corrupted Nezha into attacking Ta-Lo and Earth, prompting the other Taoist Gods into killing him. As a precaution against the Wyrm, The Jade Emperor broke the Universe Ring into twelve separate ones and scattered them across several dimensions, although ten of them returned to Ta-Lo.   The Emperor kept the Ten Rings as his personal weapons and sealed away from his throne room when not in use due their destructive power.

When Shang-Chi and his siblings travel to Ta-Lo to rescue his mother Jiang Li and stop his grandfather Chieftain Xin's plot to destroy the Zheng bloodline, the Jade Emperor restrains them with the Ten Rings for trespassing.  Xin's treachery is revealed, prompting him to don a taotie mask to overpower the Emperor and his guards before attacking Shang-Chi's siblings.  Shang-Chi reluctantly allows Zheng Zu's spirit to guide him to the Ten Rings to defeat his grandfather.  Shang-Chi dons the Ten Rings but resists their dark influence, allowing Xin to take six of the Rings and flee to the House of the Deadly Hand in Chinatown, Manhattan to destroy the Five Weapons Society.  Intrigued that Shang-Chi could wield the Ten Rings, the Jade Emperor tasks him and his siblings with apprehending Xin and recovering the remaining Rings.  Shang-Chi fights Xin but loses the remaining Rings to Xin, who orders his Qilin Riders to destroy New York City.  With no other option, Shang-Chi gives in to his dark desires, allowing him to reclaim all of the Ten Rings from Xin, unlocking their full potential and taking on his father's appearance and personality.  Shang-Chi then uses the Ten Rings to defeat Xin and all the Qilin Riders.  Before a corrupted Shang-Chi can execute Xin, he is talked down by Jiang Li and his siblings, freeing him from Zu's influence.  Afterwards, Shang-Chi hands Xin and the Ten Rings to the Jade Emperor.  One month later, the Ten Rings appear to Shang-Chi at the House of the Deadly Hand, presumably sent to him by the Jade Emperor.

Unable to access the gateways to Ta Lo, Shang-Chi has the Ten Rings sealed in a vault within the House of the Deadly Hand.  Due to the final battle between Shang-Chi and Xin being televised all over the world, the Ten Rings have become public knowledge, prompting several criminal organizations into attacking the House of the Deadly Hand to claim the Rings, forcing Shang-Chi to don them again to fight them off.  Not wanting to be tempted by the Rings again, Shang-Chi has them moved to a more secure vault.  Distrusting the Five Weapons Society with safeguarding the Ten Rings, Shang-Chi's allies from MI6 hatch a plan to keep Shang-Chi distracted while the Rings are taken by Black Jack Tarr.  When MI6's and MI13's tampering nearly causes the Ten Rings to summon the Desolation Wyrm, Shang-Chi uses them to save them and takes the Rings back from his former friends.  These events are witnessed by Nezha's brothers, Jinzha and Muzha, who question Shang-Chi's worthiness of wielding the Ten Rings, prompting them to host a Game of Rings to find a true Ring Keeper. 

Shang-Chi and nine other fighters are summoned to the Meritorious Striving Pagoda in Ta-Lo as participants for the Game of Rings; each player is given one of the Ten Rings and forced to fight against one another in the pagoda, with the winner receiving all Ten Rings.  After Shang-Chi wins the tournament, the Jade Emperor arrives to congratulate Shang-Chi, revealing that he had sent the Ten Rings to him.  Foretold of a dark prophecy warning of a threat to Earth that could only be stopped by an Earthly Ring-Keeper, the Emperor believed Shang-Chi to be this champion and at Jiang Li's urging had Jinzha and Muzha host the Game of Rings to confirm Shang-Chi's worthiness of wielding the Ten Rings.

Powers and abilities
Much like their MCU counterpart, the Ten Rings grant their user superhuman strength, durability, speed and stamina. They can be controlled telepathically in a variety of ways, including being launched as projectiles, utilized as platforms for transportation and forming makeshift chains to grab objects or restrain opponents.   The color of the Ten Rings' aura varies with the user, with the Jade Emperor's being green, Shang-Chi's being orange-red and Xin's being purple.

Unlike the MCU version, the comics Ten Rings allow their user to fly.  While the MCU Ten Rings grant their user superhuman longevity, it is not mentioned if the comics version possesses this ability.  While both versions of the Ten Rings can alter their size to accommodate their user's wrists, the Ten Rings in the comics can enlarge themselves to be big enough to ensnare a human.  The Ten Rings can also merge themselves into a single ring and can create portals to other dimensions.  The Ten Rings can also be used to empower their wielder's weapons and control them telepathically.    

As noted by the Jade Emperor, normal mortals cannot wield the Ten Rings without perishing, surmising that Shang-Chi's Ta-Lo ancestry allows him to wield them.  When attempted to be worn by those deemed unworthy, the Ten Rings will move on their own to seriously injure or even kill the attempted wielder.  However, several mortals such as Black Jack Tarr have been shown to be able to physically interact with the Rings without any ill effects.

The Ten Rings also possess a dark influence that can corrupt its user. In order to unleash the Ten Rings' true power, Shang-Chi gave in to his dark desires to do so, which greatly augmented his powers and abilities but also gave him the likeness and personality of his evil father.  Although Shang-Chi was able to fight off his father's influence,  the Ten Rings retained their unlocked power and loyalty to him.

 Other versions 
 House of M 
In the House of M reality, the Mandarin was a long-dead Chinese warlord famous for his supernatural rings. The rings (still bonded to the Mandarin's mummified hands) were apparently uncovered by Shang-Chi and his gang, but this was revealed to be a trap set by the Kingpin.

 Secret Wars (2015) 
In Secret Wars, the members of the Ten Rings school have the ability to use ten mystical martial arts techniques based on the abilities of the Mandarin's Rings from the mainstream continuity:
Mortal Blade: Makes the user's arms razor sharp. This is the only technique not based on any of the Mandarin's rings.
Nightbringer: Lets the user summon and control darkness. Based on the Nightbringer ring.
Zero Touch: Lets the user emit waves of cold and ice. Based on the Zero ring.
Flame Fist: Lets the user generate and control heat and fire. Based on the Incandescence ring.
Shocking Palm: Lets the user send bursts of lightning onto an opponent. Based on the Lightning ring.
Long Breath: Lets the user summon vortexes of wind. Based on the Spin ring.
Daemon's Eye: Lets the user emit powerful bright lights that can blind others. Based on the Daimonic ring.
Lost Hope: a telepathic ability that forces the user's psionic energy onto others. Based on the Liar ring.
Remaker: Turns the user's flesh as hard as diamond. Based on the Remaker ring.
Spectral Touch: A lethal technique that can kill anyone the user touches. Based on the Spectral ring.

While most of the Ten Rings can only use a handful of the techniques, only their master Emperor Zheng Zu can use all ten techniques while his son Shang-Chi can use nine.

 Infinity Wars 
During the Infinity Wars storyline, where the Marvel universe's lifeforms are reduced by half and combined, the Ten-Realm Rings are the signature weapons of Malekith (a fusion of Malekith and the Mandarin).  The Ten-Realm Rings are similar to the Mandarin's Rings, with each Ring possessing a unique power and originating from each of the Ten Realms: 
Asgard: Odin-power beam.  Based on the Spectral Ring.
Vanaheim: Punch ray.  Based on the Influence Ring.
Jotunheim: Frost ray.  Based on the Zero Ring.
Alfheim: White light blast.  Based on the Daimonic Ring.
Niflheim: Mist of illusion.  Based on The Liar Ring.
Svartalfheim: Black light blast.  Based on the Nightbringer Ring.
Muspelheim: Flame blast.  Based on the Incandescence Ring.
Heven: Super-speed aura.  Based on the Spin Ring.
Midgard: Electric blast.  Based on the Lightning Ring.
Nidavellir: Matter-building beam.  Based on the Remaker Ring.

 In other media 

 Film 
The Mandarin appears in The Invincible Iron Man, voiced by Fred Tatasciore. This version is an ancient ruler of a vicious Chinese dynasty who used five rings, supernatural means, and two dragon Guardians, Fin Fang Foom and Zhen Ji Xang, to subjugate his people. He was defeated after losing his rings, which were scattered around the globe to prevent him from taking over the world. By the present day, his descendant Li-Mei gathers the rings and uses their power, allowing him to project his spirit through her. However, he is eventually defeated by Iron Man.

 Marvel Cinematic Universe 

The Mandarin's rings appear in media set in the Marvel Cinematic Universe (MCU), in which they are known as the Ten Rings. They are depicted as iron rings wielded by Xu Wenwu, and later his son Shang-Chi. The Ten Rings grant their user enhanced strength and longevity, emit concussive energy blasts, and can be telepathically controlled as projectiles and tendrils. The appearance of the aura projected by the rings varies on the user, with Wenwu's resembling violent blue lightning and Shang-Chi's resembling graceful orange flames in order to reflect their distinct personalities.
 In Shang-Chi and the Legend of the Ten Rings (2021), Xu Wenwu discovers the Ten Rings a thousand years before the present day, which grant him godly powers and immortality.  Wenwu names his army of warriors after the Ten Rings and uses their power to conquer kingdoms and topple government throughout history.  Sometime after 1996, Wenwu gives up the Ten Rings after marrying Ying Li and starting a family with her, but reacquires them after Li is murdered by the triad Iron Gang, his old enemies. In 2024, Wenwu is tricked by the Dweller-in-Darkness into believing that Li is still alive and trapped in her home in Ta Lo, so that Wenwu can use the Ten Rings to destroy the Dark Gate imprisoning it.  Wenwu damages the Gate with the Rings but his disarmed by his son Shang-Chi, who is able to take the Ten Rings from him using Ta Lo's fighting style of manipulating air.  Shang-Chi is too late from preventing the Dweller from escaping; Wenwu sacrifices himself to save Shang-Chi from the Dweller and bequeaths the Ten Rings to him, who uses a combination of the Ten Rings and the Ta Lo fighting style to destroy the Dweller with a large energy blast.  Afterwards, Shang-Chi is summoned by the Sorcerer Supreme Wong to Kamar-Taj, where Wong, Bruce Banner and Carol Danvers study the Ten Rings, noting that they are far older than Wenwu and are emitting a mysterious signal.

 Television 
 Mandarin appears wearing his rings in The Marvel Super Heroes. The Mandarin's rings appear in the Iron Man animated series. In this version, the Mandarin is Arnold Brock, an archaeologist who stumbled upon a buried alien spaceship protected by clay warriors. After touching the ship's crystalline power source, he was altered by its power and discovered 10 gems within, which he fastened into his slain wife's rings to harness his powers. After using them to battle Iron Man and Force Works throughout season one, the Mandarin loses his rings and spends most of season two traveling around the world to find them. He eventually reclaims his rings and uses the Heart of Darkness' power to rob the world of technology. However, Iron Man defeats him by turning his own energy against him, costing him the right hand rings and giving him amnesia. As Iron Man leaves Brock, a group of mountain bandits find the latter and kill him for his remaining rings.
 The Mandarin's rings appear in Iron Man: Armored Adventures, where they are called the Makluan Rings.  In the series, the Makluan Rings were created by the Makluans that made their way to Earth, where they were discovered by a khan, granting him power to create a powerful empire.  The Makluan Rings made him the first Mandarin and altered his DNA to make him half-Makluan.  Before his death, the first Mandarin scattered his rings across the globe, hiding them within temples guarded by powerful warriors.  The first Mandarin only mentioned the existence of five of them so that a worthy descendant can use them. During the first season, the Mandarin's descendant Gene Khan works with Tony Stark, Pepper Potts and James "Rhodey" Rhodes to find the five Rings and ultimately steals them from his "friends".  Discovering the existence of the other five Rings, Gene forces Tony's father Howard Stark into helping him find them.  In the season two finale Gene acquires all ten of the Makluan Rings, using his Makluan DNA to activate them but his hunger for power brings about a Makluan invasion. After helping Earth's heroes repel the invaders, Gene decides to use the Makluan Rings to protect the Earth.  While the Makluan Rings possess the same abilities as the Mandarin's Rings from the comics, they can also create a suit of black and gold armor, granting the user god-like strength and invulnerability.

 Video games 
Mandarin's rings
 The Mandarin appears as a boss in Captain America and the Avengers.
 The Mandarin appears as a boss in Marvel Ultimate Alliance.
 The Mandarin appears in the Iron Man-themed table in Marvel Pinball.
 The Mandarin appeared as a boss in Marvel Avengers Alliance.
 The Mandarin appeared as a boss in Marvel Heroes.
 The Mandarin appears as a boss and an unlockable playable character in Lego Marvel Super Heroes.
 The comic book Mandarin appears as an unlockable playable character in Lego Marvel's Avengers.
 The Mandarin appeared as an unlockable playable character in Marvel Avengers Academy.

Ten Rings
 Wenwu wears the Ten Rings in Marvel Future Fight.
 Wenwu wears the Ten Rings in Marvel Super War.

 Board games 
In the Secret Wars Volume 2 for Legendary: A Marvel Deck Building Game, there is an adaptation of Battleworld version of Zheng Zu as Emperor of K'un-Lun and the Ten Rings school, the emperor's name is spelled Zheng Zhu.

 Toys 

 Mandarin's rings 

 The Mandarin is the 94th figurine in The Classic Marvel Figurine Collection.
 A figure of the Mandarin and a variant chase were released in wave 2 of Toy Biz's 6" Marvel Legends Face-Off line. The regular version was in a green outfit and was packaged with Iron Man, whereas the variant was in a red outfit and was packaged with War Machine.
 The Mandarin was released in wave 1 of Toy Biz's 1994 Iron Man line, based on his appearance from the 1994 animated series.
 The Mandarin was released in Hasbro's 3.75" figure line based on the Iron Man: Armored Adventures animated series.
 The Mandarin, under the name "Zhang Tong," was released in The Danger of Dreadknight 4-pack from the Marvel Super Hero Squad line, packaged with two figures of Iron Man and one of Dreadknight.
 A figure of the Mandarin was released in wave 36 of the Marvel Minimates line.
 A figure of the Mandarin was released in wave 5 of Hasbro's 3.75" Iron Man 2'' movie tie-in line. A red version came out in a Marvel Universe comic pack with Iron Man's Silver Centurion armor.
 A Lego mini-figure of the Mandarin was released in Lego Marvel Super Heroes set 76007 (Iron Man: Malibu Mansion Attack) and 76008 (Iron Man vs. the Mandarin: Ultimate Showdown), released by Lego in March 2013.
 A series of Mandarin figurines were released by HeroClix.

Ten Rings 

 A Lego minifigure of Xu Wenwu was released in 2021 in sets 76176 (Escape from the Ten Rings) and 76177 (Battle at the ancient village).
 A 6" figure of Xu Wenwu was released by Hasbro in 2021 as part of the Marvel Legends series.
 A Ten Rings Blaster was released by Hasbro in 2021.
 A Funko pop of Wenwu using the rings was released by Funko in 2021.

References

External links 

 Mandarin's rings at Marvel.com
 
 
 Ten Rings at the Marvel Cinematic Universe Wiki

Fictional elements introduced in 1964
Shang-Chi
Magic rings